The Atlas personality, named after the story of the Titan Atlas from Greek mythology who is forced to hold up the sky, is someone obliged to take on adult responsibilities prematurely. They are as a result liable to develop a pattern of compulsive caregiving in later life.

Origins and nature
The Atlas personality is typically found in a person who felt obliged during childhood to take on responsibilities such as providing psychological support to parents, often in a chaotic family situation. 

The result in adult life can be a personality devoid of fun, and feeling the weight of the world on their shoulders. Depression and anxiety, as well as oversensitivity to others and an inability to assert their own needs, are further identifiable characteristics. In addition, there may also be an underlying rage against the parents for not having provided love, and for exploiting the child for their own needs.<ref>Alice Miller, 'The Drama of Being a Child (London 1990) p. 38</ref>

While Atlas personalities may appear to function adequately as adults, they may be pervaded with a sense of emptiness and be lacking in vitality.

Treatment

Persons suffering from Atlas personality may benefit from psychotherapy. In such cases, a therapist talks with the patient about the patient's childhood and helps identify behavioral patterns that may have arisen from being given too many responsibilities too early in life.

See also

References

 Further reading 
L. J. Cozolino, The Making of a Therapist'' (New York 2004)

Behavioural syndromes associated with physiological disturbances and physical factors
Interpersonal relationships
Narcissism
Borderline personality disorder
Atlas (mythology)